Fourmies is a commune in the Nord department in northern France. The inhabitants are called Fourmisiens. It lies on the river Helpe Mineure (Helpe Minor or Little Helpe). Since 2015, Fourmies has been the seat of the Canton of Fourmies, an administrative division of the Nord department. The canton was created at the French canton reorganization which came into effect in March 2015.

Geography
Fourmies is situated in the Euroregion of Thiérache, a region of Northern France and Southern Belgium. The city is surrounded by forests and ponds.

History
Roman coins have been discovered in Fourmies. In the 11th century, the town was first mentioned under the name "Formeias", which may refer to the swamp area in the valley of the river Helpe Mineure. Since the 12th century, the village has been called Formies, Furmies, Formies, Formiis and Fourmies. At one time it was property of the Avesnes family, and the Liessies Abbey.

Glassworks were created in Fourmies in 1599. They were the first established in northern France.

On May 1, 1891, the Fusillade de Fourmies occurred. It was the first French and international celebration of International Workers' Day on May Day. In Fourmies, troops shot at peaceful strikers: nine died, including eight demonstrators under 21 years old, among whom a young worker who will remain a symbol, Marie Blondeau. Thirty-five strikers were also wounded.

The shooting of 1 May in Fourmies evoked strong emotions in France. It is regarded today as one of the founding events of the French Section of the Workers' International. Jean Jaurès visited Fourmies afterwards to make a speech there while Georges Clemenceau declared in front of the French Parliament that "it is the Fourth state which rose".

Heraldry

Population

Events
 Every year, since 1928, the city hosts the Grand Prix de Fourmies, a professional cycle race.
 The music festival (fête de la musique)
 The traditional fun fair (traditionnelle fête foraine) attracts many people each summer.

Economy
Medtronic has an assembly plant in Fourmies.

Twin towns – sister cities
Fourmies is twinned with:
 Fridley, United States (1978) 
 Bernburg, Germany (1967)

See also
Communes of the Nord department

References

Communes of Nord (French department)